Torsfonna is glacier at Spitsbergen, Svalbard. It is located on Lomfjordhalvøya at Ny-Friesland. It is named after the Norse god Thor. A former name of the glacier was Névé dôme Tor. Further south, between Hinlopen Strait and Lomfjorden, is the glacier Balderfonna.

References

Glaciers of Spitsbergen